The 1900 Summer Olympics was the only Olympic Games to date to feature an equestrian long jump competition. Of the seventeen competitors who entered, around half are known by name. The event was won by Constant van Langhendonck of Belgium, with silver going to Gian Giorgio Trissino of Italy and bronze to Jacques de Prunelé of France.

Background

No equestrian events were held at the first modern Olympics in 1896. Five events, including this one, were featured in 1900. Only the show jumping competition would ever be held again after that; this was the only appearance of the long jump.

Competition format

The competition format was more like a human high jump than long jump, with competitors trying to clear a fixed distance that increased with each success rather than simply jumping and measuring the distance. The equestrian long jump involved trying to clear a water jump with the take-off point moved further back each time the jump was made. The distance began at 4.50 metres, increasing gradually to 4.90 metres. Remaining riders at that point could choose subsequent distances.

Schedule

Results

The silver medal was won by an Italian competitor Gian Giorgio Trissino, who also won the joint gold medal in the Equestrian high jump competition.

References

External links 
 Megan Gibson: 9 Really Strange Sports That Are No Longer in the Olympics: Horse Long Jump, Time, July 6, 2012

Sources
 International Olympic Committee medal winners database
 De Wael, Herman. Herman's Full Olympians: "Equestrian 1900". Accessed  July 29, 2015.
 

Jumping